Lalgudi Vijayalakshmi  is a well-known Carnatic violinist, vocalist and composer. She was chosen for the Sangeetha Kalanidhi award by Madras Music Academy in 2022.

Early life
Lalgudi Vijayalakshmi was born in Chennai to violin maestro Lalgudi Jayaraman. Her brother is also a noted violinist, G.J.R.Krishnan.

She began her training under the guidance of her grandfather Lalgudi Gopala Iyer, who belonged to the sishya parampara of Tyagaraja himself and later trained under her father.

Career
Lalgudi Vijayalakshmi debuted in 1979. She travels extensively on musical tours all over the world.  Her style like her father's gayaka style closest to vocal rendition.

She performs a lot of duets with her brother, a violin player.

References

External links
 Official site

Indian violinists
Tamil musicians
Carnatic composers
1966 births
Living people
21st-century violinists